Ruben Wisdom Wollie is a Ghanaian politician and member of the first parliament of the fourth republic of Ghana representing Jaman Constituency under the membership of the National Democratic Congress.

Early life and education 
Ruben was born on 8 August 1943. He attended University of Cape Coast where he obtained his Bachelor of Education in Sociology. He worked as a teacher before going into parliament.

Politics 
Ruben began his political career in 1992 when he became the parliamentary candidate for the National Democratic Congress (NDC) to represent his constituency in the Brong-Ahafo region of Ghana prior to the commencement of the 1992 Ghanaian parliamentary election. He was elected into the first parliament of the fourth republic of Ghana on 7 January 1993 after being pronounced winner at the 1992 Ghanaian election held on 29 December 1992. He lost his candidacy to his fellow party comrade Nicholas Appiah-Kubi who defeated Rampson Stephen Ofori of the New Patriotic Party at the 1996 Ghanaian general elections. Nicholas Appiah-Kubi polled 34.70% of the total valid votes cast which was equivalent to 30,311 votes but his opponent polled 17.90% of the total valid votes cast which was equivalent to 15,608 votes.

References 

Living people
1943 births
University of Cape Coast alumni
Ghanaian MPs 1993–1997
People from Brong-Ahafo Region